The Left Bank and Other Stories is the first collection of short stories and literary debut of Dominican author Jean Rhys. It was first published by Jonathan Cape (London) and Harper & Brothers (New York) in 1927, and contained an introduction by Ford Madox Ford. The original subtitle of the collection was "sketches and studies of present-day Bohemian Paris."

Most of the twenty-two stories are impressionistic vignettes based on Rhys's own life experiences in and around the Left Bank of Paris. Some (Mixing Cocktails and Again the Antilles) are drawn from Rhys's early years in Dominica. The final story, Vienne, is based on her post-World War I life in Vienna with first husband Jean Lenglet, and was originally published in The Transatlantic Review in 1924.

Publication of The Left Bank and Other Stories came about as a result of Rhys's lover and literary mentor, Ford Madox Ford, sending the stories to his London contact, influential publisher's reader Edward Garnett. The book was well received by critics on its initial release, establishing Rhys's early writing career.    

The book went out of print during Rhys's 1939-1966 period of obscurity but, following the resurgence of her career due to Wide Sargasso Sea (1966), The Left Bank collection was republished in part by André Deutsch in Tigers are Better-Looking (1968), which included nine of the original twenty-two stories. The collection was next republished 1976 by W. W. Norton & Company, then again after Rhys's death by Penguin Classics incorporated into a wider compilation entitled Jean Rhys, The Collected Short Stories.

Stories found in The Left Bank and Other Stories
 "Illusion"
 "A Spiritualist"
 "From A French Prison"
 "In a Café"
 "Tout Montparnasse and a Lady"
 "Mannequin"
 "In the Luxembourg Gardens"
 "Tea with an Artist"
 "Trio"
 "Mixing Cocktails"
 "Again the Antilles"
 "Hunger"
 "Discourse of a Lady Standing a Dinner to a Down-and-Out Friend"
 "A Night"
 "In the Rue de l'Arivée"
 "Learning to be a Mother"
 "The Blue Bird"
 "The Grey Day"
 "The Sidi"
 "At The Villa d'Or"
 "La Grosse Fifi"
 "Vienne"

1927 short story collections
Short story collections by Jean Rhys
Jonathan Cape books
Harper & Brothers books

References

Further reading 

 Angier, Carole, Jean Rhys: Life and Work, London, André Deutsch, 1990
 Pizzichini, Lilian, The Blue Hour: A Life of Jean Rhys, New York, W. W. Norton & Company, 2009
 Frickey, Pierrette M, Critical Perspectives on Jean Rhys, Washington, DC, Lynne Rienner Publishers, 1990
Rhys, Jean, Smile Please: An Unfinished Autobiography, London, André Deutsch, 1979

External links 

 Irene Thompson, The Left Bank Apéritifs of Jean Rhys and Ernest Hemingway, The Georgia Review, Vol. 35, No. 1 (Spring 1981), pp. 94-106.
 Gwendoline Riley, From rum to gay, Gwendoline Riley on the vehement, brilliant short stories of Jean Rhys, The Times Literary Supplement, 28 April 2017.
Chris Power, A brief survey of the short story: Jean Rhys, The Guardian, 15 April 2014.
Maud Newton & Alexander Chee, After the Affair, Granta, 22 June 2009.
Kate Jones, Exploring the Short Stories of Jean Rhys, The Short Story, 28 September 2016.

Debut books